Tim Broe (born June 20, 1977, in Peoria, Illinois) is a retired American long-distance runner. He reached the 5000 meters final at the 2004 Summer Olympics finishing eleventh. Tim competed collegiately for the University of Alabama where his 3,000m steeplechase record still stands. He is a cross country running and track and field coach. In his second year of coaching Wellesley High School boys cross country, the team won the MIAA Division State Cross Country Championships.

Competition record

Also won the USA Cross Country 4K Championship in 2000 & 2001.

Personal bests
Outdoor
1500 meters – 3:38.43 (Braaschaart 2004)
One mile – 4:03.08 (Des Moines 2002)
3000 meters – 7:39.45 (Lausanne 2001)
5000 meters – 13:11.77 (Oslo 2005)
3000 meters steeplechase – 8:14.82 (Rome 2001)
Indoor
One mile – 3:58.81 (New York 2002)
3000 meters – 7:39.23 (Boston 2002)

Personal life

Tim Broe had aspirations of becoming a professional fisherman.

References

1977 births
Living people
American male long-distance runners
American male steeplechase runners
Athletes (track and field) at the 2004 Summer Olympics
Olympic track and field athletes of the United States
Sportspeople from Peoria, Illinois
Competitors at the 2001 Goodwill Games
21st-century American people